The Sarcoptidae family of mites contains the genus Sarcoptes. Sarcoptic mange is caused by borrowing mites within this genus.

References

Sarcoptiformes
Acari families